Oswald Hanfling (21 December 1927 – 25 October 2005) was an English philosopher who worked from 1970, until his death, at the Open University in the UK.

Early life
Oswald Hanfling was born in Berlin in 1927. His parents were Jewish and when their business was vandalised on Kristallnacht in 1938, he was sent to England by Kindertransport and lived in Bedford with a foster family. After the Second World War, he traced his family to Israel, with the help of the Red Cross.

Hanfling left school at 14 to become an "office boy". For the next 25 years he worked in business, eventually running his own employment agency for au pairs. He told his students that he had picked up the English language through reading comics as a young boy.

Education
Bored by business, Hanfling studied 'A' levels and then enrolled on a Bachelor of Arts in philosophy by correspondence at Birkbeck College. He gained a first, then embarked on a PhD, which he completed in 1971.

Academic work
Hanfling was appointed as a lecturer at the Open University in 1970, and worked there until retiring as a professor in 1993. His biggest influence was Ludwig Wittgenstein.

Trivia
It was impossible to tell, either from his conversation or from his writings, that Hanfling was not a native English speaker.  He once commented to Elizabeth Anscombe that he found it strange that Wittgenstein had continued to write in German throughout his life. Anscombe, who must have assumed that Hanfling was English, replied that only someone who wasn’t able to read Wittgenstein in German could have made that remark.

He was greatly admired by his students. He taught a number of Williams College students, who went to Oxford University as part of the Williams-Exeter program. He was passionate about Wittgenstein's later works and a strong advocate of ordinary language philosophy. He was averse to jargon and insisted on the use of ordinary prose in writing and speech. He was so particular about grammar and the use of words that he would often ask his students to explain their use of a comma in a particular place.

Personal life
Hanfling spent the rest of his life in England with his wife Helga, a fellow German refugee and an acclaimed painter, and their two daughters.

In 2007 a one-day conference on Wittgenstein was held, at the Walton Hall Campus on the OU, Milton Keynes, in honour of Hanfling.

Publications
Oswald Hanfling wrote many books, amongst the most popular and significant are:
Logical Positivism, Blackwell, 1981,  (his first book)
The Quest For Meaning, Blackwell,1987, 
Life and Meaning: A Philosophical Reader (Editor), Blackwell, 1988, 
Wittgenstein's Later Philosophy, Palgrave Macmillan, 1989, 
Philosophical Aesthetics (Contributing Editor), Blackwell, 1992 
Ayer, Weidenfeld & Nicolson, 1997, 
Philosophy and Ordinary Language: The Bent and Genius of Our Tongue, Routledge, 2003, 
Wittgenstein and the Human Form of Life, Routledge, 2002,

References 

1927 births
2005 deaths
Kindertransport refugees
Jewish emigrants from Nazi Germany to the United Kingdom
German philosophers
Jewish philosophers
Philosophers of language
Wittgensteinian philosophers
Alumni of Birkbeck, University of London
Alumni of University of London Worldwide
Academics of the Open University
German male writers
British philosophers